Boxing at the 2015 African Games in Brazzaville was held from 6 to 12 September 2015.

Results

Men's events

Women's events

Medal table

2015 African Games
African Games
Boxing at the African Games